

Laguna Cachimbo is a lake in the Beni Department, Bolivia. At an elevation of 196 m, its surface area is 26.56 km².

Lakes of Beni Department